River Almond may refer to:

 River Almond, Lothian, which goes by Livingston and Cramond
 River Almond, Perth and Kinross, a tributary of the River Tay
 Andira inermis, known as river almond, a tree native to Central and South America